Ashok Sarma is an Indian  politician from Assam belonging to Bharatiya Janata Party. He was elected  as a legislator of the Assam Legislative Assembly from Nalbari in 2016.

References

Living people
Bharatiya Janata Party politicians from Assam
Place of birth missing (living people)
Year of birth missing (living people)
Assam MLAs 2016–2021